The 2016 Copa Libertadores Femenina was the eighth edition of the Copa Libertadores Femenina, South America's premier women's club football tournament organized by CONMEBOL. The tournament was played in Uruguay from 6 to 20 December 2016.

In the first final without a team from Brazil, Paraguayan team Sportivo Limpeño won their first title against Estudiantes de Guárico from Venezuela.

Teams
The competition was contested by 12 teams: the champions of all ten CONMEBOL associations were given one entry, additionally the title holders re-entered and the host association qualified one more team. The qualifying competitions of each association usually end late in the year (September to December). The Colombian tournament finished last, in fact only a week after the final draw was made. With Generaciones Palmiranas qualifying from Colombia it was the first time the Copa Libertadores was held without Formas Íntimas, who were the only team from that country to have played in all previous editions.

Notes

Venues

Matches were played in the Estadio Charrúa in Montevideo and the Estadio Profesor Alberto Suppici in Colonia del Sacramento.

Match officials
One referee plus two assistant referees were announced from every association to officiate the matches.

Format
There were no format changes to the previous seasons. The teams were drawn into three groups of four, where each group was played on a round-robin basis. The winners of each group and the best runners-up advanced to the semifinals, which were played on a single-elimination basis, with the following matchups:
Group A winners vs. Group B winners
Group C winners vs. Best runners-up
The semifinal winners and losers play in the final and third place match respectively.

Draw
The draw of the tournament was held on 16 November 2016, 19:30 UTC−3, at the headquarters of the Uruguayan Football Association. The 12 teams were drawn into three groups of four containing one team from each of the four seeding pots. The host teams Colon and Nacional and the title holder Ferroviaria were seeded to Group A, B and C respectively. The other teams were seeded based on the results of their association in the 2015 Copa Libertadores Femenina.

Notes

Group stage
The teams are ranked according to points (3 points for a win, 1 point for a draw, 0 points for a loss). If tied on points, tiebreakers would be applied in the following order (Regulations Article 17.1):
Goal difference in all games;
Goals scored in all games;
Head-to-head result in games between tied teams;
Penalty shoot-out if two teams tied having playing last game against each other;
Drawing of lots.

All times UYT (UTC−3).

Group A
Colón advanced to the knock-out stage as best runners-up. It was the first time in the competition history that a team from Uruguay advanced from the group stage.

Group B

Group C
Both last year's finalists Ferroviária and Colo-Colo met in Group C. Both failed to advance as Estudiantes de Guárico won the group with just 2 goals scored.

Ranking of second-placed teams
Colón already secured best runner-up spot.

Knockout stage
If tied after regulation time, extra time would not be played, and the penalty shoot-out would be used to determine the winner (Regulations Article 17.4).

Bracket
For the first time no team from Brazil reached the final.

Semifinals

Third place match

Final

Top goalscorers

Prize money
Each participating team received US$10,000, with prize money given to the top four teams.

References

External links
Copa Libertadores Femenina Uruguay 2016, CONMEBOL.com

2016
2016 in women's association football
2016 in South American football
2016–17 in Uruguayan football
International club association football competitions hosted by Uruguay